ROKS Kim Jwa-jin (SS-076) is the fourth boat of the Sohn Won-yil-class submarine in the Republic of Korea Navy. She is named after the anarchist, Kim Jwa-jin.

Design 

There are media reports that the Sohn Won-yil is equipped with eight 533 mm torpedo tubes, and that South Korea will mount a Korean Tomahawk missile, Hyunmoo-3, with a range of 500 km. It is said that they are also developing versions with a range of 1000 km and 1500 km, but there was no confirmation of whether this version could be mounted on a 533mm torpedo tube. Originally, the American Tomahawk missile was conceptually designed to be launched from a 533mm torpedo tube. Korea has also recently succeeded in localizing it.

The Cheonryong missile with a range of 500 km has been installed in the Sohn Won-yil-class and has been deployed and is in operation.

Germany, which exported the Sohn Won-yil-class (class 214), is using a Type 212 submarine that uses the same AIP system with the same displacement. It has a range of 20 km, and is equipped with four 533 mm torpedo tube, and is capable against air, surface, and submarine targets.

Construction and career 
ROKS Kim Jwa-jin was launched on 13 August 2018 by Daewoo Shipbuilding and commissioned on 31 December 2014.

References

Attack submarines
2013 ships
Ships built by Daewoo Shipbuilding & Marine Engineering
Type 214 submarines